OMFGG – Original Music Featured on Gossip Girl No. 1 is the soundtrack to The CW television series Gossip Girl, including music featured throughout its first season. It was released digitally on September 2, 2008 (one day after the second season premiere), followed by a CD release on October 28.

Track listing

References

2008 soundtrack albums
Atlantic Records soundtracks
Gossip Girl
Television soundtracks